The arrival of several waves of Hispanic, and other Caribbean, immigrants to Florida since the late 1800s has played an important role in the development of Floribbean cuisine. The use of seafood, as well as of Asian and Caribbean ingredients and cooking methods have made Floribbean cookery generally healthier than meat- and fat-heavy cuisines. 

Floribbean-style cooking also incorporates an exotic spice pantry: red curry, lemongrass, ginger, and scallions are as commonly used today in Floribbean cookery as grits and cobbler are in other parts of Florida.

As Floribbean cuisine evolved in South Florida it was strongly influenced by Asian culinary principles emphasizing the use of locally harvested Asian fruits and vegetables that will grow only in tropical and subtropical parts of the continental United States, where it rarely freezes.

Typical features of Floribbean cuisine include an emphasis on fresh ingredients and complex medleys of spices, especially strong flavors offset by milder ones. Floribbean cooking often uses less spicy heat than the Caribbean dishes that inspire it, but there is extensive use of several kinds of peppers. This pungency, however, is almost always moderated by the use of mango, papaya, rum, almond, coconut, key lime, or honey.

Latin-Floribbean cuisine mixes Floribbean cuisine with Latin-American cuisine, resulting in strong Cuban, Puerto Rican, and Dominican influences.

Notes

Bibliography
Hartz, Deborah (2004). "What Goes Around..." South Florida Sun Sentinel. March 25.
Lang, John (2007). "America, the Melting Pot." Foodservice Director. August 15.
Parseghian, Pamela (2002). "Hunger for new tastes drives Caribbean menu influences." Nation's Restaurant News.
Richman, Alan (2004). Fork it over: the Intrepid Adventures of a Professional Eater. New York: HarperCollins.
Bennett, Michael (2009) "In the Land of Misfits, Pirates and Cooks". The Professional Image

Caribbean-American culture in Florida
Caribbean cuisine
Florida cuisine